Tough Grit – The Rural America Challenge is a weekly 30-minute television show produced by GRIT magazine and Berkeley Square Media, Inc. with major sponsorship provided by Tractor Supply Company, broadcast nationally on the satellite/cable channel RFD-TV. It combines expert information on rural subjects with humor to help viewers complete common rural-based DIY projects quickly, correctly and safely. The first show premiered September 3, 2012. It is hosted by Shannon Reilly and Caleb Reagan. Episodes are also archived for viewing at ToughGrit.com.

Each Tough Grit episode centers around a particular everyday rural farm chore, ranging from mending a fence or mucking a horse stall to grading a lane and throwing a hoe down. Contestants team up with experts from GRIT magazine and Tractor Supply Company to compete in head-to-head challenges and try to accomplish the task faster, better and more safely than their opponents.  The winner(s) can receive up to a $1,000 gift card to Tractor Supply Company. The expert from GRIT magazine is consistently Oscar H. Will III, Editor-in-Chief of GRIT magazine, while the TSC expert is a different store manager or district manager for each show.

Episodes
Key
 In the № column the number refers to the order it aired during the entire series.
 In the # column the number refers to the episode number within its season.
 The production code refers to the code assigned to the episode by the production team, which is the order in which the episode was produced, which is not necessarily the airing order.

{| class="wikitable plainrowheaders" style="width:100%; margin:auto;"
|+ Tough Grit season 1 episodes
|-
! scope="col" style="background:#dedde2;" | №
! scope="col" style="background:#dedde2;" | Air #
! scope="col" style="background:#dedde2;" | Title
! scope="col" style="background:#dedde2;" | Original airdate
! scope="col" style="background:#dedde2;" | Prod. code

|}

Notes

2012 American television series debuts
RFD-TV original programming